Opasquia Provincial Park is a provincial park located in northwest Ontario, Canada. The Opasquia park is home to many different species of plants and animals.

Geographical features
The park is accessible by float plane only. Hundreds of lakes and dozens of rivers flow northwest through this  park. The northwestern water flow is considered an anomaly due to the fact all other bodies of water in Ontario flow northeast towards Hudson Bay and James Bay. This can be attributed to the Cocos Plateau formed from glaciers during the last ice age.

The reason the Opasquia Park has been protected as a wilderness park has more to do with its distinctive geology. A ridge of glacial till two kilometres wide rises 100 metres above its surroundings here. This is called the Opasquia Moraine. On the sides of the moraine, wave-cut terraces and segments of raised shoreline indicate the former limit of glacial Lake Agassiz.

Wildlife 
The wolverine population is what makes this park unique. Opasquia Provincial Park supports one of the largest concentration of wolverines in North America. The park also has large numbers of moose, bear, eagles, otters, beavers, and wolves. Hundreds of others species of birds have been identified, and northern pike and walleye dominate the fisheries in this park. Whitefish and perch have also been found in its waters.

Park facilities
This park is a non-operating park, which means it does not have any visitors’ facilities. There is one known fly-in tourist operation located within the park named Big Hook Wilderness Camps . The resort caters to fisherman and nature lovers.

References

External links

Provincial parks of Ontario
Parks in Kenora District
Protected areas established in 1983
1983 establishments in Ontario